Andrew Bajadali (born May 1, 1973 in Boulder, Colorado) is an American former professional cyclist, who now works as a directeur sportif for UCI ProTeam , and UCI Women's Continental Team .

Major results

2005
 1st Overall Tour of Utah
 1st Overall Boulder Stage Race
 2nd Overall Mount Hood Cycling Classic
1st Stage 2
 2nd Tour de Nez
 2nd Nevada City Classic
2006
 1st Tri-Peaks Challenge
 3rd Tour de Toona
2007
 1st Overall Redlands Bicycle Classic
 1st Overall Tri-Peaks Challenge
1st Stage 5
2008
 2nd Overall Tour des Pyrénées
 2nd Tour de Nez
2009
 1st Overall Tour of Thailand
 2nd Road race, National Road Championships
2012
 2nd Tobago Cycling Classic

References

External links

1973 births
Living people
American male cyclists
Cyclists from Colorado